Henri Benedictus van Raalte (11 February 1881 – 4 November 1929), known as H. van Raalte, was an Australian artist and printmaker.

Early life and training 
Van Raalte was born in Lambeth, London in 1881 to a Dutch father, Joel van Raalte, a cigar merchant, and an English mother, Frances Elizabeth nee Cable. He was educated at the City of London School, the Royal Academy and later in Belgium and the Netherlands. In 1901 he was elected an associate of the Royal Society of Painter-Etchers and Engravers, and in the same year had a picture hung at the Royal Academy exhibition. In 1902 there were full-page reproductions of an etching, and a dry-point by van Raalte in Modern Etching and Engraving, published by the Studio at London, highly competent and assured pieces of work, though he was then aged only 21.

Western Australia 
In 1910 he went to Western Australia and founded a school of art at Perth. He did many etchings and aquatints, often taking gum trees for his subjects, but it was some time before his work became known in the eastern states. He had an exhibition of his work at Perth in 1919 which was followed by another at Adelaide. In 1921 he was appointed curator of the art department at Adelaide, and in 1922 his title was changed to curator of the Art Gallery of South Australia. He resigned in January 1926 after interference by Sir William Sowden, president of the Gallery's board, in the hanging of what Van Raalte considered "bad art". He established a studio at Second Valley, South Australia, and lived there for the last three years of his life.

Death 
Except for occasional fits of depression van Raalte was apparently in good health, and it was intended that he should hold an exhibition of his work at Adelaide about the end of 1929. On 4 November of that year he was found in the grounds of his house shot through the head, and he died on the same day, leaving a widow and three sons.

Van Raalte Place, in the Canberra suburb of Conder, is named in his honour.

References 

  Clifford-Smith, Silas (2010), 'Henri van Raalte' (peer reviewed biography), Dictionary of Australian Artists Online,

External links 
 Images of prints by Australian artist Henri van Raalte

1881 births
1929 suicides
Australian printmakers
Artists who committed suicide
Suicides in South Australia
Suicides by firearm in Australia
Deaths by firearm in South Australia
Australian people of Dutch descent
English emigrants to Australia
1929 deaths